The 2012 AirAsia Renault Clio Cup UK season is a multi-event, one make motor racing championship held across England. The championship features a mix of professional motor racing teams and privately funded drivers, competing in a Clio Renault Sport 200 that conform to the technical regulations for the championship. It forms part of the extensive program of support categories built up around the BTCC centrepiece.

This season is the 17th Renault Clio Cup United Kingdom season. The season commenced on 31 March at Brands Hatch – on the circuit's Indy configuration – and will conclude on 21 October at the same venue, utilising the Grand Prix circuit, after sixteen races to be held at eight meetings, all in support of the 2012 British Touring Car Championship.

Regulation changes

Teams and drivers
A 23-driver entry list was released by series organisers on 20 March 2012.

Race calendar and results
The 2012 calendar supports the BTCC at all rounds, with no major changes from 2011.

Championship standings

Drivers' Championship

References

Renault Clio Cup
Renault Clio Cup UK seasons